The Social Justice Coalition  was an electoral alliance in Egypt. It was formed by Hussein Abdel-Ghani.

Formerly affiliated parties 
 Egyptian Social Democratic Party 
 Socialist Party of Egypt
 Socialist Popular Alliance Party
 Constitution Party

References

2012 establishments in Egypt
Defunct left-wing political party alliances
Defunct political party alliances in Egypt